Nicolas Vincent (baptized Ignace-Nicolas; 11 April 1769 – 31 October 1844), known also as Tsaouenhohoui, meaning "one who plunges things into the water," or Tsawenhohi, meaning "he who sees clearly," was the Grand Chief of the Hurons of Lorette from 1811 to 1844. He was the last Huron chief to bear the name Tsaouenhohoui. In 2001, he was listed as a Person of National Historic Significance for having "elevated the position of Grand Chief to an unprecedented level of respectability".

Biography

Nicolas Vincent was born on 11 April 1769 to Louis Vincent (Sawantanan) and Louise Martin (Thodatowan). On 24 November 1794, he was married to Véronique Petit-Étienne, a Huron, and they had nine children. On 22 January 1821, he was remarried to Madeleine, a Malecite who was the widow of Pierre-Jacques Thomas of Penobscot.

In 1803, he was named War Chief. By 1810, he became Grand Chief. For the next three decades, he actively tried to reclaim and secure Huron lands from colonizers and loggers operating within the borders of the Huron-Wendat. This effort that eventually took him to England in 1825, alongside the Council Chiefs, André Romain (Tsohahissen) and Stanislas Koska (Aharathanha), and the War Chief, Michel Tsiewei (Téhatsiendahé). They had several conversations with various members of Parliament including the colonial secretary, Lord Bathurst. On 8 April 1825, King George IV received the four Huron chiefs. The London Times reported the exchange between the Huron grand chief and the British sovereign, who had bestowed medals bearing his likeness to the four.

In French, Vincent addressed the sovereign: 

After the speech, King George IV promised that he would take every occasion to enhance their well-being, ensure their happiness, and show himself to be truly a father. He then conversed with them in French for more than a quarter of an hour.

A few years later, Nicolas Vincent was the first Native to speak to the members of the Assembly of Lower Canada. In 1829, at the request of colonial authorities, he drew the map known as the 'Vincent Plan' which identified the hunting lands used by the Hurons.

He died on 31 October 1844 in Jeune-Lorette.

Plaque
In 2005, a plaque was approved to be made at the site of his home, 186 Nicolas-Vincent Street, Wendake, Quebec, which reads:

References

Wyandot people
Great Lakes tribes
Indigenous peoples of the Northeastern Woodlands
First Nations in Ontario
Persons of National Historic Significance (Canada)
1769 births
1844 deaths